Deir Qanoun En Nahr      is a municipality in Southern Lebanon, located in Tyre District, Governorate of South Lebanon.

Name
According to E. H. Palmer in 1881,  Deir Kânûn meant: the convent of the rule (canon).

History
In the early 1860s, Ernest Renan noted here a decorated Sarcophagus.

In 1875, Victor Guérin found the village to be inhabited by 400  Metualis. He further noted: "Here I saw an ancient rock-cut basin, many cut-stones built up in private houses or forming the enclosure of gardens and cisterns, and, on the surface of a block lying on the ground, figures carved, to the number of five, each in a different frame. Unfortunately they are much mutilated by time and rough usage. The best preserved has the head surmounted by the high Egyptian coiffure known under the name of pschent, and holds in one hand a sort of curved stick."

In 1881, the PEF's Survey of Western Palestine (SWP) described it: "A village, built of stone, situated on the top of a hill, surrounded by gardens, fig-trees, olives, and arable land, containing about 250 Metawileh; water supply from springs, birket, and cisterns."

References

Bibliography

External links
Deir Qanoun En Nahr, Localiban
Survey of Western Palestine, Map 2:   IAA, Wikimedia commons

Populated places in Tyre District
Shia Muslim communities in Lebanon